Axel Gueguin (born 24 March 2005) is a French professional footballer who plays as a winger for Montpellier.

Professional career
Gueguin is a youth international for Montpellier since 2011, and was promoted to their reserves for the 2021-22 season. He was promoted to their senior team in advance of the 2022-23 season in the Ligue 1. He made his senior and Ligue 1 as a late substitute with Montpellierin a 4–2 loss to Toulouse FC on 2 October 2022.

International career
Gueguin is a youth international for France, having played for the France U17s in their tournament-winning campaign at the 2022 UEFA European Under-17 Championship.

Honours
France U17
 UEFA European Under-17 Championship: 2022

References

External links
 
 FFF Profile

2005 births
Living people
Sportspeople from Montpellier
French footballers
France youth international footballers
Association football wingers
Ligue 1 players
Championnat National 2 players
Championnat National 3 players
Montpellier HSC players